Charles Ahlfeldt (7 December 1952 – 20 August 1978) was a South African cricketer. He played in five first-class matches for Eastern Province from 1975/76 to 1977/78.

Ahlfeldt was a fast-medium bowler. He suffered injury problems throughout his short career and was grossly overweight and a poor fieldsman and batsman, but he was an effective opening bowler, generating surprising pace from a short run-up. His best figures were 5 for 68 for Eastern Province B against Orange Free State in 1977/78. He died suddenly in his home town of Port Elizabeth at the age of 25.

See also
 List of Eastern Province representative cricketers

References

External links
 

1952 births
1978 deaths
South African cricketers
Eastern Province cricketers
Cricketers from Port Elizabeth